Dolicharthria bruguieralis is a species of moth in the family Crambidae. It is found from France, Portugal, Spain, Italy, Croatia, Romania, Bulgaria, the Republic of Macedonia, Albania, Greece and Turkey, east to Japan and Taiwan. It is also found in Africa, including Morocco, Algeria and South Africa.

References

Moths described in 1833
Moths of Europe
Moths of Asia
Moths of Africa
Spilomelinae
Taxa named by Philogène Auguste Joseph Duponchel